Nicarchus or Nicarch was a Greek poet and writer of the 1st century AD, best known for his epigrams, of which forty-two survive under his name in the Greek Anthology, and his satirical poetry. He was a contemporary of, and influence on, the better-known Latin writer Martial. A large proportion of his epigrams are directed against doctors. Some of his writings have been found at Oxyrhynchus in Egypt.

A fragment of Nicarchus:

The Raven
The gloom of death is on the raven’s wing,
The song of death is in the raven’s cries:
But when Demophilus begins to sing,
The raven dies.

Nicarchus is also the name of a character in a play of Aristophanes, The Acharnanians.

Nicarchus was also the name of a Paeonian king, known only from his issuing of a coin. He was perhaps of the late 4th century BC.

External links
 Poems by Nicarchus English translations
 Nicarchus: translation of all surviving epigrams at attalus.org; adapted from W.R.Paton (1916–18)

1st-century Greek people
1st-century Greek poets
Epigrammatists of the Greek Anthology
Iambic poets
Year of birth unknown
Year of death unknown